Fatima Saad (January 15, 1966 -) is a Syrian actress. She works in Venus Centre as a dub actress.

Works

Dubbing 
Animaniacs - Dot Warner
Pokémon as Jesse (1st voice), Melanie (ep10)
One Piece
Naruto (season 1 only)  as Hinata Hyuga, Konohamaru Sarutobi, Kurenai Yūhi, Haku, Tsunami, Suzume
Digimon Adventure as Zain (Joe Kido), Tentomon, Puppetmon
Digimon Adventure 02 as Arukenimon, LadyDevimon, DemiDevimon
Digimon Tamers as Kazu Shioda
Digimon Frontier as Lucemon Chaos Mode
Hunter × Hunter (1999) as  the mother of Mito Freecss, Feitan Portor, Shizuku Murasaki, Baise, Pakunoda, Eliza
Jungle Book: Boy Mowgli as Luri, THUNDER, Meshua
Captain Tsubasa as Jun Misugi (young) (seasons 2,4,5), Takeshi Sawada (season 2) Natsuko Ozora (seasons 2,4,5), Kazuo Tachibana (season 4), Hajime Taki (season 5), Manabu Okawa (season 5) 
Aoi Blink as Blink
Dash! Yonkuro as Shinkuro Minami, Nanny 
Grimm's Fairy Tale Classics
Trapp Family Story as Maria Kutschera von Trapp, Rosy
Robin Hood (1990 TV series) as Cleo, Winnifred
Tiger Mask II as Midori Ariyoshi
The Legend of Zorro (anime series) as MARIA
Christopher Columbus (anime) 
Honō no Tōkyūji: Dodge Danpei as Taiga Nikaidō, Haruka Ichigeki, LAZARO
Nadia: The Secret of Blue Water as Grandis Granva, Ikorina
Ironfist Chinmi
Detective Conan as Yukiko Kudo (seasons 2 and 3), Mitsuhiko Tsuburaya (season 3), Genta Kojima (seasons 4,6), Miwako Sato (season 4), Vermouth (ep 178)
Detective Conan: The Fourteenth Target as Genta Kojima
Detective Conan: The Last Wizard of the Century as Genta Kojima
Phantom 2040 as Gorda, Rebecca Madison
The Magic School Bus (TV series)
Yokoyama Mitsuteru Sangokushi
The Rainbow Fish as Mrs. Chips, Wanda
Animaniacs as Dot Warner, Cleopatra
Dragon Ball as Launch
Dragon Ball Z (season 1 only) as Oolong, Pigero, Fortuneteller Baba
Bakusō Kyōdai Let's & Go!! as Tokichi Mikuni, Tamami Yanagi
Bakusō Kyōdai Let's & Go!! WGP as Tokichi Mikuni, Tamami Yanagi
Bakusō Kyōdai Let's & Go!! MAX as Tokichi Mikuni

References

Syrian television actresses
Syrian voice actresses
Living people
1966 births
Syrian stage actresses
Place of birth missing (living people)